Yang Ying may refer to:

 Yang Longyan (897–920), born Yang Ying (楊瀛), ruler of the Five Dynasties and Ten Kingdoms period state Wu
 Yang Ying (curler) (born 1994), Chinese female curler
 Yang Ying (table tennis, born 1953), retired Chinese women's table tennis player
 Yang Ying (table tennis, born 1977), retired Chinese women's table tennis player
 Angelababy (born 1989), real name Yang Ying (楊穎), Hong Kong-Chinese actress, model and singer from mainland China